Ludwig Philipp (20 December 1889 – 4 January 1964) was a German international footballer and later manager.

References

1889 births
1964 deaths
Association football midfielders
German footballers
Germany international footballers
1. FC Nürnberg players
German football managers
SpVgg Greuther Fürth managers